Rieu can refer to:
André Rieu (born 1949), Dutch violinist and conductor
Annette Rieu, a character in Jeanne Galzy's 1929 novel L'Initiatrice aux mains vides (Burnt Offering)
Bún riêu, a Vietnamese meat
D. C. H. Rieu (1916–2008), scholar
Charloun Rieu (1846–1924), French farmer and poet
Charles Pierre Henri Rieu (1820–1902), Swiss Orientalist
E. V. Rieu (1887–1972), translator
Jean Rieu (18th century), banker, owner of Prangins Castle (1719–1723)
Jean-Louis Rieu (1788-1868), soldier and politician
Jean Louis Rieu (20th century), Commissioner of Sind in British India (1920–1925)
Nicole Rieu (born 1949), French singer
 (1859 (?)–1901), architect
Willem Nicolaas du Rieu (1829–1896), librarian of Leiden University Library